Oakland is an unincorporated community in Cherokee County, located in the U.S. state of Texas. According to the Handbook of Texas, the community had a population of 50 in 2000. It is located within the Tyler-Jacksonville combined statistical area.

History
The area in what is known as Oakland today may have been settled sometime after the American Civil War. There was a church, a store, and a few scattered houses in Oakland in the 1930s. The store closed after World War II. Only a church, a cemetery, and several scattered houses remained in 1990. Its population was 50 in 2000.

Geography

Education
Oakland had its own school in 1896 and had 46 students enrolled. It was still operational in the 1930s. It joined the Rusk Independent School District after World War II.

Notes

Unincorporated communities in Cherokee County, Texas
Unincorporated communities in Texas